Buniyaad (literally Foundation) is an Indian television soap opera directed by Ramesh Sippy and Jyoti. The series was written by Manohar Shyam Joshi and dealt with the Partition of India in 1947 and its aftermath. It first aired in 1986 on the Indian state television channel DD National. It was re-aired on DD Metro and Sahara One. Nowadays, it is re-aired on DD Retro. The story spans the life in India between 1916-1978.

Plot 
Haveliram lives in Bicchowali Gali, Lahore in 1947 before the Partition of India. Haveliram was forced to migrate during Partition of India and reached to Purana Qila in Delhi After sometime get a house as a claim for the property they left behind in Pakistan at Lajpat Nagar, Delhi.

Cast

References

External links 
 

DD National original programming
Indian television soap operas
Partition of India in fiction
1986 Indian television series debuts
1980s Indian television series
Television shows set in the British Raj
Television shows set in Lahore
Indian independence movement fiction
Indian period television series
Television shows set in Delhi
1987 Indian television series endings
Indian political television series